Robert James Parks (born 15 June 1959) is a former English cricketer who played for Hampshire County Cricket Club. He is the grandson of Jim Parks senior and son of Jim Parks junior. A wicketkeeper, Parks kept wicket for England during a Test against New Zealand at Lord's in 1986 as a substitute for Bruce French. He helped Hampshire to win the 1986 John Player Special League and the 1988 Benson & Hedges Cup, and was part of an "English Counties XI" tour of Zimbabwe in 1984-5,

Parks played for Hampshire between 1980 and 1992. He made 700 wicket-keeping dismissals for the club, setting a club record. In 1993 he played briefly for Kent, making one first-class and one List A match, both at Maidstone in early July.

Parks coached the France national cricket team in 1998.

References

External links

1959 births
Living people
English cricketers
Kent cricketers
Hampshire cricketers
English cricket coaches
Marylebone Cricket Club cricketers
Wicket-keepers